SKZ2021 is the second compilation album by South Korean boy band Stray Kids. It was released digitally on December 23, 2021, through JYP Entertainment. It consists of fourteen tracks that the group had released previously, but re-recorded versions consisting of their current lineup, which were not included in their previous compilation album, SKZ2020 (2020), as well as the Korean version of "Scars", which serves as its lead single.

Background and release

Following the departure of Woojin from Stray Kids in late October 2019, the group released their first compilation album SKZ2020 on March 18, 2020, as the group's Japanese debut. SKZ2020 consists of 27 tracks of the 8-member re-recorded version of several previous songs since their pre-debut EP Mixtape (2018), and the singles "My Pace", "Double Knot", and "Levanter" recorded in Japanese. On January 1, 2021, the group uploaded the video Step Out 2021, containing the group's achievements in 2020, and to-do plans of 2021, including their upcoming SKZ2021, which and highlighted the title of the tracks not included on the previous SKZ2020. 

Almost a year after uploading Step Out 2021, on December 21, the group uploaded a poster to announce SKZ2021 would be released on December 23 at 6:00 PM KST to digital music and streaming platform only. The complete track listing was revealed on the next day, consisting of thirteen of the previous-release tracks from the debut EP I Am Not (2018) to the sixth EP Clé: Levanter (2019), including the CD-exclusive tracks, titled "Mixtape", which use the original title instead, as well as "Scars", the group's second Japanese single recorded in Korean. The special music video of "Placebo", stated that it was made by the group's alter ego as SKZ Company personnel from their online program SKZ Code, was released on December 24.

Commercial performance

In Japan, SKZ2021 entered Oricon Digital Albums Chart at number five with 959 download units, as well as Billboard Japan Hot Albums at number 40, selling 955 downloads, debuted at number four on the component Download Albums. The lead single "Scars (Korean ver.)" reached number 114 on the Gaon Download Chart, while the track "Hoodie Season" number 39 on the Hungarian Single Top 40 Chart.

Track listing

Notes

 "Placebo", "Behind the Light", "For You", "Broken Compass", and "Hoodie Season", which are an original title, titled "Mixtape#1", "Mixtape#2", "Mixtape#3", "Mixtape#4", and "Mixtape#5", respectively on its original included EP.

Credits and personnel

Credits adapted from Melon.

Musicians

 Stray Kids – lead vocals 
 Bang Chan (3Racha) – background vocals , lyrics , composition , arrangement , computer programming , instrumentation 
 Changbin (3Racha) – background vocals , lyrics , composition 
 Han (3Racha) – background vocals , lyrics , composition 
 Lee Know – background vocals , lyrics , composition 
 Hyunjin – background vocals , lyrics , composition 
 Felix – background vocals , lyrics , composition 
 Seungmin – background vocals , lyrics , composition 
 I.N – background vocals , lyrics , composition 
 Armadillo – composition 
 Versachoi – arrangement , instrumentation , computer programming 
 Kim Park Chella – background vocals , composition , arrangement , computer programming , guitar , bass , keyboard , drum programming 
 Glory Face (Full8loom) (Jang Jun-ho) – composition , arrangement , instrumentation 
 This N That – composition , arrangement , computer programming , piano , synthesizer 
 Lee Woo-min 'Collapsedone' – arrangement , computer programming , synthesizer , piano , bass 
 KZ – background vocals , composition , MIDI programming , electric piano , bass 
 Space One – composition , arrangement , MIDI programming , piano , bass 
 Lee Seung-han – background vocals 
 Jukjae – guitar 
 Frants – composition , arrangement , computer programming , guitar , keyboard , synthesizer , drum programming 
 Slo – composition , arrangement , computer programming , synthesizer , drum programming , flute programming , bass programming 
 Hong Ji-sang – composition , arrangement , computer programming , guitar , keyboard , drum programming 
 Doplamingo – arrangement , computer programming , acoustic guitar , keyboard , drum programming , bass 
 Sojun – acoustic guitar , electric guitar 
 Cash Pie – electric guitar 
 J;Key – composition , arrangement , piano , bass , synthesizer , computer programming 
 Edmmer – arrangement , instrumentation 
 Alom – arrangement , instrumentation 

Technical

 Bang Chan (3Racha) – digital editing 
 Glory Face (Full8loom) (Jang Jun-ho) – digital editing 
 This N That – digital editing 
 Yue – vocal editing , additional vocal editing 
 KZ – vocal editing 
 Kim Hye-kwang – vocal editing 
 Hong Ji-sang – vocal editing 
 Jiyoung Shin NYC – additional editing 
 Edmmer – sound design 
 Alom – sound design 
 Choi Hye-jin – recording , additional recording , mixing 
 Kwak Jeong-shin – recording 
 Jung Mo-yeon – recording 
 Jung Eun-kyung – recording 
 Woo Min-jung – recording 
 Eom Se-hee – recording , mixing , mixing assistant 
 Noh Min-ji – recording 
 Hong Eun-yi – recording 
 Lim Hong-jin – recording , mixing 
 Jang Han-soo (JYPE Studio) – recording 
 Kim Min-hee – recording 
 Lee Sang-yeop – recording , additional recording 
 Lee Kyung-won – additional recording 
 Lee Tae-sub – mixing 
 Nahzam Sue – mixing 
 Yoon Won-kwon – mixing 
 Cliff Lin – mixing 
 Jang Han-soo (Looda Sound) – mixing 
 Shin Bong-won – mixing 
 Kwon Nam-woo – mastering 
 Park Jeong-eon – mastering 

Locations

 JYP Publishing (KOMCA) – original publishing , sub-publishing 
 Copyright Control – original publishing 
 Hybe – original publishing 
 Kwang Sound – vocal editing 
 JYPE Studios – recording , additional recording , mixing 
 The Vibe Studio – recording 
 In Grid Studio – recording 
 821 Sound – recording , mastering 
 U Productions – additional recording 
 Wormwood Hill Studio – mixing 
 Studio DDeepKick – mixing 
 Glab Studio – mixing 
 Nonhyeon-dong Studio – mixing 
 RCAVE Sound – mixing 
 Honey Butter Studio – mastering

Charts

Sales

Release history

References

2021 compilation albums
JYP Entertainment albums
Korean-language compilation albums
Stray Kids albums